Schwarzenbek-Land is an Amt ("collective municipality") in the district of Lauenburg, in Schleswig-Holstein, Germany. It is situated around Schwarzenbek. Its seat is in Schwarzenbek, itself not part of the Amt.

The Amt Schwarzenbek-Land consists of the following municipalities (population in 2005 between brackets):

References

Ämter in Schleswig-Holstein